MatSu United FC is a semi-professional soccer club based in Palmer, Alaska. The club began playing in the Last Frontier Division of the United Premier Soccer League in 2019.

History 
The club was founded as Alaska City FC in 2011. On June 5, 2018 it was announced the team would join the semi-professional UPSL, becoming the first Alaskan soccer club to play at the fifth-tier of soccer or above. The team made its league debut on June 7, 2019 in a scoreless draw against Arctic Rush.

Following the club's debut UPSL season, Alaska City FC rebranded as MatSu United FC on May 23, 2020. The new name is a reference to the Matanuska-Susitna Valley, where the club calls home.

Stadium 
For the 2019 season, it was announced that the club would play its home matches at Machetanz Field in Palmer, Alaska.

Current roster

Club management

Record

2019 Spring season

References

External links 
 Official website

Association football clubs established in 2011
Soccer clubs in Alaska
United Premier Soccer League teams
2011 establishments in Alaska